The 1922 European Rowing Championships were rowing championships held in the Port of Barcelona in the Spanish city Barcelona. The competition was for men only and they competed in five boat classes (M1x, M2x, M2+, M4+, M8+), the same ones as had been used at the 1920 Summer Olympics in Antwerp.

Medal summary

References

European Rowing Championships
European Rowing Championships
International sports competitions hosted by Spain
European Rowing Championships
Rowing Championships
Rowing competitions in Spain
Sports competitions in Barcelona